Lauretta Masiero (25 October 1927 – 23 March 2010) was an Italian actress and singer.

Biography

Dancing career
Venetian born Lauretta Masiero debuted in the theater of varieties as a dancer with Wanda Osiris. In 1945 she debuted with Macario.

Acting career
In 1962 she began acting in films. She worked with such stars as Totò, Ugo Tognazzi, Johnny Dorelli, Raimondo Vianello and Oreste Lionello. She portrayed the protagonist in the television series, The Adventures of Storm Laura.

Personal life
Lauretta was married to Johnny Dorelli; the couple had a son, actor Gianluca Guidi.

Death
Masiero died, aged 82, on 23 March 2010, in a clinic in Rome, following a long hospitalization from Alzheimer's disease.

Filmography

References

External links

 

1929 births
2010 deaths
20th-century Italian actresses
Deaths from Alzheimer's disease
Deaths from dementia in Italy
Italian female dancers
Italian film actresses
Italian stage actresses
Italian television actresses
Actors from Venice